Physical Review E is a peer-reviewed, scientific journal, published monthly by the American Physical Society. The main field of interest is collective phenomena of many-body systems.  It is currently edited by Uwe C. Täuber. While original research content requires subscription, editorials, news, and other non-research content is openly accessible.

Scope
Although the focus of this journal is many-body phenomena, the broad scope of the journal includes quantum chaos, soft matter physics, classical chaos, biological physics and granular materials.

Also emphasized are statistical physics, equilibrium and transport properties of fluids, liquid crystals, complex fluids, polymers, chaos, fluid dynamics, plasma physics, classical physics, and computational physics.

Former names
This journal began as "Physical Review" in 1893. In 1913 the American Physical Society took over "Physical Review". In 1970 "Physical Review" was subdivided into Physical Review A, B, C, and D. From 1990 until 1993 a process was underway which split the journal then entitled  " Physical Review A: General Physics" into two journals. Hence, from  1993 until 2000, one of the split off journals became Physical Review E: Statistical Physics, Plasmas, Fluids, and Related Interdisciplinary Topics. In 2001 the journal was changed, in name, to its present title. As an aside,  in January  2007, the section which published works on classical optics was transferred from "Physical Review E" to "Physical Review A". This action unified the classical and quantum parts of optics into a single journal.

Rapid Communications
Physical Review E Rapid Communications was announced on June 7, 2010. This section (or feature) gives priority to results which are deemed significant, and merits a prominent display on the Physical Review E website. The specific article is displayed for several weeks, and is part of a rotation with other articles, also deemed significant.

Abstracting and indexing
Physical Review E is indexed in the following bibliographic databases:

Science Citation Index Expanded
Current Contents / Physical, Chemical & Earth Sciences
Chemical Abstracts Service - CASSI
Current Physics Index
Inspec
MEDLINE
Index Medicus
PubMed
NLM catalog
Physics Abstracts
SPIN

See also
 American Journal of Physics
 Annales Henri Poincaré
 Applied Physics Express
 CRC Handbook of Chemistry and Physics
 European Physical Journal E
 Journal of Physical and Chemical Reference Data
 Journal of Physics A

References

External links
Editorial: 40th Anniversary of Physical Review A. American Physical Society. July 1, 2010.

Publications established in 2001
Physics journals
Fluid dynamics journals
English-language journals
Monthly journals
American Physical Society academic journals